Fullerton Union High School is a public high school located in the Orange County, California city of Fullerton, operated by the Fullerton Joint Union High School District.

History
In 1893 a special election was held to create Fullerton Union High School. The school's first classroom, a rented room on the second floor of the Fullerton Elementary School building, was adequate to house the eight pupils, which constituted the first year's enrollment and the 32 books which made up the library. The high school was the second in Orange County.

In 1908, FUHS's enrollment was increasing at the rate of 18 percent a year. To accommodate the growth, the school was moved to new quarters on West Commonwealth Avenue, an area now known as Amerige Park.

School enrollment continued to grow and within two years a new polytechnic building was built to ease the overcrowding. But on November 17, 1910, the day before it could be occupied, the older FUHS building burned to the ground.

FUHS was housed in the polytechnic building and four tents that year. After the fire, the school's trustees debated the best location for rebuilding. The district owned the ground on which the polytechnic building stood, but the campus was small, and school work was disrupted by the numerous Santa Fe trains that roared by each day.

In 1911, the present site was purchased one block east of Harbor (Spadra) Boulevard. A walnut orchard was removed prior to building, and the former site was sold to the City of Fullerton for use as a park.

The school's facilities have changed over the years to meet educational and community needs. Plummer Auditorium was built in 1930-32 and its original ironwork, which was made by students on the campus, was kept when Plummer was refurbished and remodeled to meet earthquake standards in 1972 (the first class to use the auditorium for Baccalaureate was the Class of 1972). Since then the stadium, locker rooms, and the agriculture complex have been rebuilt. The latest replacement was the swimming pool and the science building. In 2009 a new building housing many new classrooms including several new computer driven classrooms was opened.

Renovations of Plummer Auditorium were completed in 1993. It included new lighting, audio and dressing room upgrades. Air conditioning and an orchestra lift was added as well. The Charles Kassler fresco "Pastoral California" was uncovered and completely restored in 1997.

Academics
The school provides opportunities for students to be involved in Honors, Advanced Placement (AP), and International Baccalaureate (IB) courses.

Athletics
Fullerton's sports teams are known as the Indians, and are members of the California Interscholastic Federation's Southern Section.

Notable alumni

Many of Fullerton's notable alumni are listed on the FUHS Wall of Fame.

 Bob Blackburn, NBA play-by-play announcer
 David Boies, lawyer, including Bush v. Gore and Perry v. Schwarzenegger
 Hoby Brenner, NFL player
 John Brenner, NCAA shot put and discus champion
 John V. Briggs, California State Senator and Assemblyman
 Marvin Burns, Olympic water polo player
 Steve Busby, Major League Baseball player
 Jim Bush, coach in National Track and Field Hall of Fame
 Vicki Calhoun, former backing vocalist of Red Hot Chili Peppers
 Del Crandall, Major League Baseball player and manager
 Sue S. Dauser, Superintendent of the United States Navy Nurse Corps
 Viet D. Dinh,  lawyer, legal scholar and Assistant Attorney General of United States
 Daniel Fells, NFL player
 Darren Fells, NFL player 
 Leo Fender, electric guitar innovator 
 Keith Ginter, Major League Baseball player
 Willard Hershberger, Major League Baseball player
 Walter Johnson, Major League Baseball player and Hall of Fame member (did not graduate)
 Chuck Jordan, vice president of GM design
 Natalie Kaaiawahia, national high school record holder, shot put
 Michael Lorenzen, Major League Baseball player
 Erin Mackey, actress
 Alfonso Márquez, Major League Baseball umpire
 Thomas L. McFadden (class of 1896), college football player and attorney
 Richard Nixon, 37th President of the United States (did not graduate; transferred to Whittier High School for his junior and senior year)
 Chris Norby, California State Assemblyman
 Jim Norton, professional football player
 Brig Owens, NFL player
 John Raitt, actor and singer
 Cruz Reynoso, California Supreme Court justice
 Ann Stanford, poet
 Keith Van Horne, NFL player
 Arky Vaughan, Major League Baseball player and Hall of Fame member
 Diane Wakoski, poet
 Jessamyn West, author

References

External links
 Fullerton Union High School official website

Education in Fullerton, California
Educational institutions established in 1893
High schools in Orange County, California
International Baccalaureate schools in California
Public high schools in California
1893 establishments in California